Orchid is a British charity which funds research into the diagnosis, prevention and treatment of prostate, penile and testicular cancer and promotes awareness about these diseases. It was set up in 1996 by former testicular cancer sufferer, Colin Osborne.

See also 
 Cancer in the United Kingdom

References

Health charities in the United Kingdom
Cancer organisations based in the United Kingdom
Cancer research
1996 establishments in the United Kingdom
Organizations established in 1996